The Indian Creek Bridge is a wrought iron bridge, built about 1880 to the east of Cedar Rapids, Iowa. The bridge crosses a tributary of the Cedar River in Linn County. It was designed and built by the Wrought Iron Bridge Company (WIBCO) of Canton, Ohio as an eight-panel pin-connected through truss in an unusual double-intersection Pratt design.

The bridge rests on stone piers and abutments, with timber pile piers and abutments supporting the timber stringer approach spans. The bridge deck is timber, laid perpendicular to the span. The bridge features decorative cresting and lattice lateral bracing. The truss uses rigid horizontal and vertical members and rod bracing for the diagonals.

The Indian Creek Bridge was placed on the National Register of Historic Places on May 15, 1998.

References

Road bridges on the National Register of Historic Places in Iowa
Bridges in Linn County, Iowa
Wrought iron bridges in the United States
National Register of Historic Places in Linn County, Iowa
Pratt truss bridges in the United States
Bridges completed in 1880
1880 establishments in Iowa